Patrick Jessie Burrows was a New Zealand rugby league player who represented New Zealand.

Playing career
Burrows played for the Hawke's Bay and in 1921 was selected to represent New Zealand. New Zealand toured Australia that year. No Test matches were played on tour, instead New Zealand played Queensland and New South Wales.

References

Living people
New Zealand rugby league players
New Zealand national rugby league team players
Hawke's Bay rugby league team players
Rugby league hookers
Year of birth missing (living people)